Amara biarticulata is a species of beetle in the family Carabidae. It is found in East Europe and further east in the Palearctic realm.

References 

biarticulata
Beetles of Asia
Beetles of Europe
Beetles described in 1845
Taxa named by Victor Motschulsky